The Museum of the City of New York (MCNY) is a history and art museum in Manhattan, New York City, New York. It was founded by Henry Collins Brown, in 1923 to preserve and present the history of New York City, and its people. It is located at 1220–1227 Fifth Avenue between East 103rd to 104th Streets, across from Central Park on Manhattan's Upper East Side, at the northern end of the Museum Mile section of Fifth Avenue.

The red brick with marble trim museum was built in 1929–30 and was designed by Joseph H. Freedlander in the neo-Georgian style, with statues of Alexander Hamilton and DeWitt Clinton by sculptor Adolph Alexander Weinman facing Central Park from niches in the facade.

The museum is a private non-profit organization which receives government support as a member of New York City's Cultural Institutions Group, commonly known as "CIG"s. Its other sources of income are endowments, admission fees, and contributions.

The museum is hosting the "New York At Its Core" permanent exhibition, the first-ever museum presentation of New York City's full history.

History

The museum was originally located in Gracie Mansion, where available space was limited.  One of its first major exhibits was "Old New York", presented in the Fine Arts Building on West 57th Street in 1926.  The success of the project led to a search for a new, permanent headquarters for the museum. A design competition was held between five invited architects, and the Colonial Revival design by Freedlander was selected. The city donated a site on Fifth Avenue, and funds for construction of the museum building were raised by public subscription. The original plans for the museum's building were scaled back as a result of the Wall Street Crash of 1929, nevertheless, the building was dedicated on January 11, 1932.

On January 24, 1967, the museum building was designated a New York City landmark.

In 1982, the museum received The Hundred Year Association of New York's Gold Medal Award "in recognition of outstanding contributions to the City of New York."

Proposed move

In 2000, the administration of mayor Rudy Giuliani told the museum that it could relocate to the historic Tweed Courthouse near City Hall in Lower Manhattan. El Museo del Barrio would then have moved across the street to occupy the current Museum of the City of New York building.  This decision was overturned by the incoming administration of Michael Bloomberg, which decided to use the Courthouse as the headquarters for the new New York City Department of Education, causing MCNY's then-director Robert R. McDonald to tender his resignation.  McDonald was replaced in 2002 by Susan Henshaw Jones, who was at the time the president of the National Building Museum in Washington, D.C.

There was also an attempt to merge the museum with the New-York Historical Society, which did not come to fruition, and the museum was passed over for space at the World Trade Center site.

Expansion
The museum's former director, Susan Henshaw Jones, recommitted MCNY to its East Harlem neighborhood by planning an extension to the museum.  The groundbreaking for this extension, which included renovation of existing gallery space, as well as a new pavilion, took place on August 2, 2006, and it was completed in February 2008 with a ribbon cutting later that same year.

The pavilion gallery, designed by the Polshek Partnership, is  glass addition, which has two levels for which to display artifacts. The original 1932 Georgian Revival building was also restored during this project, as well as additions including a vault for the museum's silver collection, a research room and a room for the handling of artifacts. The total costs for the first phase of refurbishments came to $28 million.

In late 2011, the museum temporarily took over operation of the South Street Seaport Museum which reopened in January 2012.

Collection
The museum's collection of over 1.5 million items – which is particularly strong in objects dating from the 19th and early 20th centuries – include paintings, drawings, prints, including over 3000 by Currier and Ives, and photographs featuring New York City and its residents, as well as costumes, decorative objects and furniture, antique toys– the museum was the first in the United States to establish a curatorial department for toys – ship models, rare books and manuscripts, marine and military collections, police and fire collections, and a theater collection which documents the golden age of Broadway theater.  There are also dioramas about the city's history as well as its physical environment.

Among the rare items in the museum's collection is a chair that once belonged to Sarah Rapelje, daughter of Joris Jansen Rapelje of Nieuw Amsterdam, and said to be the first child born in New York State of European parentage. The chair was donated by her Brinckerhoff descendants.

The museum is known for its comprehensive collection of photographic images, which includes works by noted photographers Percy Byron, Jacob Riis and Berenice Abbott, as well as many Depression-era Federal Art Project photographs.  The collection also includes still photography by film director Stanley Kubrick.

MCNY was also the longtime home to recreations of two furnished rooms from the house of John D. Rockefeller, donated by the Rockefeller family. In 2008, the museum disposed of the rooms, donating one to the Metropolitan Museum of Art and the other to the Virginia Museum of Fine Arts. Notable as well is a model of New Amsterdam based on the Castello Plan of 1660.

Notable exhibitions

From October 2004 through July 2009, Perform was the only permanent exhibition in New York City focused on theater in New York. It included objects ranging from Bill "Bojangles" Robinson's tap shoes to advertising materials from Avenue Q.

In June 2007, the museum opened its temporary "The Glory Days, 1947–1957" exhibition, an in-depth photographic look at the history of professional baseball in New York City. The exhibit included clips of Ed Sullivan, a pioneer of CBS television entertainment, interviewing many of the players of the era, including Mickey Mantle and Phil Rizzuto.  A section was devoted to Jackie Robinson, who broke the color line in 1947 when he joined the former Brooklyn Dodgers and became an active participant in the Civil Rights Movement.

In May 2012, the museum opened a new space devoted to the Puffin Foundation and its collection. The inaugural exhibit focused on social activism and New York City's activist roots.

In November 2016 the museum opened New York At Its Core, a three-gallery exploration of New York City's 400-year history and the city's future.  It features over 450 historic objects and images, many from the museum's collection, as well as contemporary video, photography, and interactive digital experiences.

Until September 15, 2019, the exhibition "In the Dugout with Jackie Robinson: An Intimate Portrait of a Baseball Legend" was on display. In honor of the centennial of Robinson's birth, the exhibition featured memorabilia, rare footage, and published magazines of the Robinson family.

In February 2020, the exhibit “City/Game: Basketball in New York” opened. The exhibit explored the history of basketball in New York City, including players like Kareem Abdul-Jabbar and Bob Douglass.

See also
List of museums and cultural institutions in New York City
List of New York City Designated Landmarks in Manhattan from 59th to 110th Streets

References

External links

 
 Puffin Foundation

1923 establishments in New York City
Art museums and galleries in New York City
New York
East Harlem
Fifth Avenue
City of New York
Museums established in 1923
Museums in Manhattan
New York City Designated Landmarks in Manhattan